Wacław Rolicz-Lieder (* September 27, 1866 in Warsaw, Poland, † April 25, 1912), was a Polish Symbolist poet and translator of German poetry.

He was the son of a German immigrant bank clerk, and a Polish mother.

Works

Poezje I, Krakau 1889;
Poezje II, Krakau 1891 (only 60 copies printed);
Elementarz języka arabskiego (elementary book of the Arab one), Kirchhain 1893;
Wiersze III, Krakau 1895 (only 50 copies);
Abu Sajid Fadlullah Ben Abulhair i tegoż czterowiersze (translation from the Persian one), Krakau 1895;
Moja Muza, Krakau 1896 (only 30 copies);
Wiersze V, Krakau 1898 (only 20 copies);
Nowe Wiersze, Krakau 1903 (collected poems, 100 copies);
Wybór Poezji, Krakau 1962, (500 copies);
Poezje wybrane, Warsaw 1962, (1000 copies).

External links
Waclaw Rolicz-Lieder

Polish poets
1866 births
1912 deaths
Writers from Warsaw